Schitu Golești is a commune in Argeș County, Muntenia, Romania. It is composed of six villages: Burnești, Costiță, Lăzărești, Loturi, Schitu Golești and Valea Pechii.

References

Communes in Argeș County
Localities in Muntenia